Veikko is a male Finnish given name. Notable people with the name include:

 Veikko Aaltonen (born 1955), Finnish director, editor, sound editor, and production manager
 Veikko Asikainen (1918–2002), Finnish footballer
 Veikko Ennala (1922-1991), Finnish journalist
 Villle-Veikko Eerola (born 1992), Finnish ice hockey player
 Veikko Hakulinen (1925-2003), Finnish cross country skier and Olympic medalist
 Veikko Haukkavaara (1921–2004), Finnish artist 
 Veikko Heinonen (born 1934), Finnish ski jumper
 Veikko Aleksanteri Heiskanen (1894–1971), Finnish geodesist
 Veikko Helle (1911–2005), Finnish politician 
 Veikko Huhtanen (1919-1976), Finnish gymnast
 Veikko Huovinen (born 1927), Finnish novelist
 Veikko Hursti (1924-2005), Finnish philanthropist
 Veikko Huuskonen (1910–1963), Finnish boxer and Olympic competitor
 Veikko Hyytiäinen (1919-2000), Finnish politician
 Veikko Kankkonen (born 1940), Finnish ski jumper
 Veikko Kansikas (1923-1991), Finnish politician
 Veikko Karppinen (born 1986), Finnish ice hockey player
 Veikko Karvonen (born 1926), Finnish athlete
 Veikko Antero Koskenniemi (1885-1962), member of the Finnish Academy
 Veikko Larkas (1909–1969), Finnish architect
 Veikko Lavi (1912-1996 ), Finnish singer, songwriter and author
 Veikko Lavonen (born 1945), Finnish wrestler and Olympic competitor
 Veikko Lommi (1917–1989), Finnish rower and Olympic medalist
 Risto-Veikko Luukkonen (1902-1972), Finnish architect
 Veikko Muronen (1927–2006), Finnish engineer heavy vehicle designer
 Veikko Pakarinen (1910-1987), Finnish gymnast and Olympic medalist
 Veikko Hannes Ruotsalainen (1908–1940), Finnish skier
 Veikko Salminen (born 1945), Finnish modern pentathlete, fencer and Olympic medalist
 Veikko Savela (born 1919), Finnish agronomist
 Veikko "Jammu" Siltavuori (born 1926), Finnish murderer and sexual offender
 Veikko Sinisalo (1926–2003), Finnish actor
 Veikko Suominen (1948-1978), Finnish ice hockey player 
 Veikko Täär (born 1971), Estonian actor
 Veikko Törmänen (born 1945), Finnish painter
 Veikko Turunen (1930-2006), Finnish Lutheran clergyman and politician
 Veikko Vennamo (1913–1997), Finnish politician.

References

Finnish masculine given names